Kelly James Burnham (born March 29, 1966), known professionally as Alan Roach, is an American sports announcer and radio personality.  He currently is the public address announcer for the Minnesota Vikings, Colorado Avalanche, and Colorado Rapids. Roach is also the voice of NFL events worldwide, and a public address announcer at 5 Olympic Games. He is one of the current voices of the underground train system in Denver International Airport. His announcing credits include 13 Super Bowls, 5 Olympic gold medal hockey games, and multiple All-Star games for the National Football League, National Hockey League, and Major League Baseball. He also serves as the announcer in EA Sports' since Madden NFL 21 (Super Bowl only since Madden NFL 23), as well as the FIFA series.

Career
Roach began his radio career as a high school student in Slayton, Minnesota in 1982.  His early radio career included numerous radio stops including Fort Dodge, IA and Des Moines, IA, Garden City, KS, and Colorado Springs, CO.  In 1991, he landed in Denver, CO as afternoon host on KRFX radio.  In 2000, Roach began as morning sports anchor on 850 KOA radio in Denver. In addition to daily sports reports on the station, Roach also served as pre-game host, sideline reporter, and postgame interviewer for the Denver Broncos Radio Network, where KOA was the network's flagship station. He was dismissed from KOA in June 2015.

Roach's first sports announcing job was as the public address announcer for the Colorado Springs Sky Sox in 1990. He was asked to fill in for the regular PA announcer during a vacation; the former announcer never got his job back.  Since then, Roach has become one of the most heard sports event public address announcers in the world.

Roach was hired as the public address announcer for the Colorado Rockies prior to the first game they played as a franchise in 1993.  Roach served as PA announcer for every home game in Mile High Stadium and later Coors Field through the 2006 MLB season. Roach missed only one game in 14 years: Saturday, June 9, 2001. Roach began as public address announcer for the Colorado Avalanche with their first game played in Pepsi Center for the 1999-2000 season. On June 9, 2001 Roach missed the Rockies game to announce the historic Stanley Cup Game 7 win over the New Jersey Devils. He announced the post-game ceremony in which Joe Sakic famously handed the Stanley Cup to Ray Bourque. Roach continues as the public address announcer for the Avalanche today.  He was also the public address announcer for the Denver Grizzlies' only season in the International Hockey League from 1994-1995 during their Turner Cup-winning season, providing Roach with his first Championship Ring. The Colorado Avalanche hosted the 2001 NHL All-Star game.  Roach served as PA announcer for that game and the following NHL All-star games in Sunrise, Florida in 2003 and in St. Paul, Minnesota in 2004.

Roach's hockey announcing goes well beyond the NHL.  Roach served as English-speaking public address announcer for all men's Olympic hockey games at the E-Center in Salt Lake City, Utah for the 2002 Winter Olympic Games.  Roach was at the mic for the historic gold medal win by the Canadians over Team USA on February 24, 2002.  Roach also announced hockey in Turin, Italy at the 2006 Winter Olympic Games at Torino Palasport Olimpico.  Roach was English announcer during the women's gold medal game won by Canada, 4-1 over Sweden, on February 20, 2006.  One day later, Roach was at the mic again for what is widely considered one of the best hockey games of all time, the 2006 men's gold medal game won by Sweden 3-2 over Finland. 4 years later, Roach was also heard in Canada Hockey Place in Vancouver announcing men's and women's games at the 2010 Winter Olympic Games. Roach announced the Canadian women's gold medal win over Team USA on February 25, 2010.  Roach was at the mic one more time in Sochi, Russia for the 2014 Olympic Winter Games hockey match between Team Russia and Team USA when TJ Oshie took the game-winning shot as the Americans beat the Russians on February 15, 2014.  Roach also announced the gold medal win by the Canadians over Sweden, and the Swiss women's hockey team's first ever medal, a bronze, on February 22, 2014.

Roach handled public address announcing duties for Super Bowls from 2006 - 2013, starting with Super Bowl XL in Detroit through Super Bowl XLVII in New Orleans, Louisiana. Fans did not get to hear Roach's voice during the 2014 Super Bowl, as the NFL cited a potential competitive advantage for the Broncos having their regular P.A. announcer be the announcer at the Super Bowl.  The same situation presented itself in 2016, as the Denver Broncos played the Carolina Panthers in Super Bowl 50. As the voice of NFL events, Roach is heard annually at league events like the NFL Draft, Pro Football Hall of Fame Induction Ceremony, NFL International Series in London, England, Pro Bowl, and the Super Bowl. Roach resumed PA duties at Super Bowl LI in 2017.

In the summer of 2016, after 16 seasons as the stadium voice for the Denver Broncos, Roach left Broncos Country and returned to his childhood home of Minnesota to announce for the Minnesota Vikings as the team moved to their new home, U.S. Bank Stadium, in August 2016.

In addition to sports announcing, Roach is also lent his voice for many voice-over projects, none heard more than his voiceover of the underground train system at Denver International Airport, along with local 9News anchor Adele Arakawa.

In February 2018, Roach was re-elected to be the male voice for the underground train system at Denver International Airport. Local 9News anchor Kim Christiansen was selected as the female voice to replace her former colleague from 9News, Adele Arakawa.

In 2019, he served as the voice of London Stadium for the 2019 MLB London series between the Boston Red Sox and the New York Yankees.

He also became the announcer of EA Sports' Madden NFL series since Madden NFL 21 (Super Bowl only since Madden NFL 23), as well as the FIFA'' series.

He has stated that he is fan of English football club Crystal Palace

References

External links
 AlanRoach.net, official site
 Voice123.com profile

Living people
Public address announcers
National Hockey League public address announcers
National Football League public address announcers
1966 births
Colorado Avalanche announcers
Colorado Rockies announcers
Denver Broncos announcers
Minnesota Vikings announcers